Gennadiy Sergeyevich Chernovol (born June 6, 1976 in Soviet Union) is a former Kazakhstani athlete who competed in the sprints events. He is married to a high jumper, Anna Chicherova.

Competition record

References

1976 births
Living people
Kazakhstani male sprinters
Athletes (track and field) at the 2000 Summer Olympics
Athletes (track and field) at the 2004 Summer Olympics
Olympic athletes of Kazakhstan
Asian Games medalists in athletics (track and field)
Athletes (track and field) at the 1998 Asian Games
Athletes (track and field) at the 2002 Asian Games
Universiade medalists in athletics (track and field)
Asian Games silver medalists for Kazakhstan
Medalists at the 2002 Asian Games
Universiade silver medalists for Kazakhstan
Medalists at the 2001 Summer Universiade